The Church of Jesus Christ of Latter-day Saints in the Philippines (Filipino: Ang Simbahan ni Jesucristo ng mga Banal sa mga Huling Araw) refers to the organization and its members in the Philippines.

The Philippines ranks as having the most members of the LDS Church among countries in Asia (most of Asia's LDS Church membership is located in the Philippines) and the fourth most worldwide. In 2021, The Philippines also had most LDS Church members per capita in Asia.

History

The first contact the church had with the Philippines was in 1898 during the Spanish–American War. Two LDS men, Willard Call and George Seaman, who were part of the United States artillery battery, were set apart as missionaries and began to proselytize after being deployed to the Philippines. However, they met with little success. Active proselytizing stopped at the onset of World War II.

The first Filipino to join the LDS Church was Aniceta Pabilona Fajardo in 1945, who was introduced to the church by Maxine Grimm, who was in the Philippines with the Red Cross in the aftermath of World War II.

The Luzon Serviceman's District was organized during the Korean War under the Japanese Mission for American servicemen stationed in the Philippines. In August 1955, the district was then transferred to the newly organized Southern Far East Mission, under the direction of Joseph Fielding Smith, a member of the Quorum of the Twelve. During this time, Smith visited the Philippines. Due to legal issues, the LDS Church could not send missionaries to the country. Missionary work, however, was done by LDS servicemen and American residents, including Kendall B. Schaefermeyer, a returned missionary serving in the U.S. Navy. He had baptized four Filipinos by October 1957 and was teaching more than 20 others.

During 1960, Gordon B. Hinckley, then an Assistant to the Twelve, and apostle Ezra Taft Benson, visited the Philippines. The purpose of the visit was mainly to see the work of the LDS servicemen groups, but they brought back encouraging reports of the missionary work being done among the native Filipinos.

The church obtained official recognition in the Philippines in 1961 when Robert S. Taylor, president of the Southern Far East Mission, filed the paperwork with the Philippine government. Subsequently, on 28 April 1961 in a meeting with servicemen, American residents, and Filipino members, Hinckley rededicated the country. The first American missionaries (Ray Goodson, Harry Murray, Kent Lowe and Nestor Ledesma) arrived in Manila two months later. One of the first converts after official recognition was the family of José Gutierez, Sr. By the end of 1961, six more were baptized.

Due to growth that followed, the Philippines was organized into its own mission by 1967, with Paul S. Rose as the first president. In 1969, the church spread across the islands, having the highest amount of baptisms compared to every other area of the world. This led to the division of the Philippines Mission in 1974 into the Philippines Manila and Philippines Cebu City missions.

The first stake in the Philippines was formed in Manila on 20 May 1973. In September 2017, the number of stakes in the Philippines reached 100, only the fifth nation in the world to reach that milestone.

Church president Spencer W. Kimball presided over two area conferences, one in 1975 and another in 1980. During the area conference in 1980, Kimball met with then-President Ferdinand Marcos at Malacañang Palace. In 1987, Manila became the headquarters of the church's Philippines/Micronesia Area.

Augusto A. Lim, the first Filipino general authority, was called to the Second Quorum of Seventy in June 1992.

In 1987, the Book of Mormon was translated into Tagalog by Ricardo Cruz, with the assistance of Posidio Ocampo and Ananias Bala in the final stages of production. Since then, the Book of Mormon has been translated to several other languages of the Philippines.

On June 30, 2021, The LDS Church broke ground for Asia's first "For the Strength of Youth (FSY) Camp" located in Tanay, Rizal, near Manila.

Notable people  
Lani Misalucha, singer dubbed as "Asia's Nightingale" by MTV Southeast Asia.
 Eric Tai, a Tongan actor from New Zealand, model, TV host, comedian, and rugby union player who played for the Alabang Eagles and represented the Philippines national rugby union team in 15s and 7s.
 Jairus Aquino, a Filipino actor best known for his roles in Super Inggo, Kung Fu Kids, and Luv U.
 Xia Vigor, Filipina child actress

Missions

Philippines Angeles Mission
Philippines Antipolo Mission
Philippines Bacolod Mission
Philippines Baguio Mission
Philippines Butuan Mission
Philippines Cabanatuan Mission
Philippines Cagayan de Oro Mission
Philippines Cauayan Mission
Philippines Cavite Mission
Philippines Cebu Mission
Philippines Cebu East Mission
Philippines Davao Mission
Philippines Iloilo Mission
Philippines Laoag Mission
Philippines Legazpi Mission
Philippines Manila Mission
Philippines Naga Mission
Philippines Olongapo Mission
Philippines Quezon City Mission
Philippines Quezon City North Mission
Philippines San Pablo Mission
Philippines Tacloban Mission
Philippines Urdaneta Mission

Philippines Missionary Training Center
The Philippines has its own Missionary Training Center (MTC), where native Filipinos receive missionary training in their own language. The first MTC was dedicated on October 8, 1983, and was housed in a private rented residence. The second MTC was opened July 13, 1992, and stands across the road from the Manila temple. In 2011, the MTC underwent extensive remodeling and was rededicated in May 2012 by Russell M. Nelson. Other nations, including those listed below, send missionaries to the Philippines MTC to receive training in their native language.

 India
 Pakistan
 Mongolia
 Cambodia
 Thailand
 Indonesia
 Taiwan
 Hong Kong
 Singapore
 Vietnam
 Malaysia
 Bangladesh
 Sri Lanka

As of January 2017, the MTC president is Rodolfo A. Carlos.

Temples

Operating

Under Construction

Announced

See also

The Church of Jesus Christ of Latter-day Saints membership statistics
Religion in Philippines

References

Additional reading
"The Philippines: Spiritual Strength upon the Isles of the Sea", Liahona, April 2014

External links

 The Church of Jesus Christ of Latter-day Saints Newsroom - Philippines
 The Church of Jesus Christ of Latter-day Saints (Philippines) - Official Site
 The Church of Jesus Christ of Latter-day Saints - Visitors Site